The Journal of Materials Science: Materials in Medicine is a peer-reviewed scientific journal published by Springer Science+Business Media. It is an offshoot of the Journal of Materials Science, focusing specifically on materials in medicine and dentistry. The founding editor in chief was William Bonfield; the current editor-in-chief is Luigi Ambrosio (National Research Council (CNR) Naples, Italy).

According to the Journal Citation Reports, the Journal of Materials Science: Materials in Medicine has a 2020 impact factor of 3.896.

Scope 
The journal's content focusses on the development of synthetic and natural materials for orthopaedic, maxillofacial, cardiovascular, neurological, ophthalmic and dental applications. Further, biocompatibility studies, nanomedicine, studies on regenerative medicine, computer modelling, and other advanced experimental methodologies are included.

References

External links 
 
 European Society of Biomaterials

English-language journals
Publications established in 1990
Springer Science+Business Media academic journals
Materials science journals
Monthly journals